"L'isola delle rose" is a song by Italian singer Blanco. It was released as a single on 27 January 2023 by Island Records and Universal Music.

Music video
The music video for "L'isola delle rose", directed by Simone Peluso, was released on the same day via Blanco's YouTube channel.

Personnel
Credits adapted from Tidal.
 Blanco – associated performer, lyricist, composer, vocals
 Michelangelo – producer and composer

Charts

References

2023 singles
2023 songs
Island Records singles
Blanco (singer) songs
Songs written by Blanco (singer)